The American Physician Scientists Association (APSA) is dedicated to career development and community building among physician-scientists in training.

Organization and purpose
The American Physician Scientists Association (APSA) is a national organization dedicated to addressing the needs of future physician-scientists with respect to their training and career development. APSA strives to be the student physician-scientists' leading voice for improving educational opportunities, advancing patient-oriented research, and advocating for the future of translational medicine.  In this regard, it carries out local and national initiatives, provides student leadership opportunities, facilitates communication between physician-scientist trainees, and hosts a joint annual meeting for its members.  It also collaborates with leading research and health organizations, including the National Institutes of Health.

History
The American Physician Scientists Association was initially conceived in 2003-2004 and formally incorporated in 2005 by a group of MD-PhD students.  Since then, the organization been rapidly expanding, and is currently officially represented at almost 100 institutions across the U.S.  Its growing membership has helped make it the largest organization specifically representing physician-scientist trainees.

Leadership
The American Physician Scientists Association is led by the Executive Council. Executive Council members are voted in by Institutional Representatives. These are physician-scientist trainees and APSA members who serve as liaisons between students at local institutions and the APSA leadership.  Institutional Representatives help the Executive Council better grasp the needs of trainees at their local institutions.

The Executive Council is overseen by the Board of Directors, which serves as an advisory board to the rest of the organization, and consists of active physician-scientists and former APSA Executive Council members. In addition to the Board of Directors and Executive Council, there are five standing committees who lead most of APSA's projects. Members of the APSA have the opportunity to serve on any of the organization's five standing committees, each of which has a unique role within the organization to help it achieve its mission. Currently, the standing committees operate in the areas of organizational finances, membership recruitment, organizational policy, public relations, and Annual Meeting planning. APSA also works with numerous partner organizations and supporters.

Meetings
The APSA has held its Annual Meeting since April 2005 in conjunction with the American Society for Clinical Investigation and the Association of American Physicians in Chicago, Illinois. The meeting serves as an opportunity for mentoring and networking across the entire spectrum of the physician-scientist career pathway, including career development sessions and panels.  A number of prominent speakers have been featured at these meetings including current NIH Director Francis Collins, Nobel Prize in Physiology or Medicine winner and former National Cancer Institute Director Harold Varmus. Several dozen competitive travel grants are typically available for APSA members who wish to present their research at the meeting.  The Annual Meeting is also when the Executive Council of APSA meets to conduct a yearly review, propose future initiatives, and vote for positions on next year's Executive Council.

Starting in 2006, the APSA began hosting regional meetings and currently hosts four in the fall of each year in cities across the United States.  The primary focus of these regional meetings is on building a regional community of physician-scientist trainees and focusing on outreach to current and future trainees who are unable to attend the Annual Meeting.

External links
 

Medical associations based in the United States
Medical and health professional associations in Chicago
Organizations established in 2005
2005 establishments in Illinois